Colin Richard Knight (born 24 May 1956) is a former English cricketer.  Knight was a right-handed batsman who fielded as a wicket-keeper.  He was born in Barrow-in-Furness, Lancashire.

Knight made his debut for Cumberland in the 1987 Minor Counties Championship against Durham.  Knight played Minor counties cricket for Cumberland from 1987 to 1992, including 19 Minor Counties Championship matches and 6 MCCA Knockout Trophy matches.  In 1992, he played his only List A match against Essex in the NatWest Trophy.  In this match he scored 21 runs before being dismissed by Don Topley.

References

External links
Colin Knight at ESPNcricinfo
Colin Knight at CricketArchive

1956 births
Living people
Sportspeople from Barrow-in-Furness
Cricketers from Cumbria
English cricketers
Cumberland cricketers
Wicket-keepers